Wanship is a census-designated place in Summit County, Utah, United States. The population was 400 at the 2010 census.

Wanship is located at the intersection of Interstate 80 and Utah State Route 32, at the junction of Silver Creek and the Weber River.

History
Wanship was founded in 1859 by Stephen Nixon and Henry Roper, who were joined by other settlers over the next two years. In 1861, 300 Native Americans settled in the area. The sudden population increase made attempting to gather food in the area difficult. A friendly Ute, Chief Wanship, helped the non-native settlers to find game, locate edible plants, and trade with the Indians. In return, the town was named for him.
Farming in the area included rye, barley, wheat, and alfalfa. The town also served as a local commodity hub, as coal from Coalville, silver from Park City, and lumber from Kamas passed through. In 1862 an overland stage stop, called the Kimballs Stage Station, opened in Wanship. Due to its central location, Wanship became the first county seat of Summit County, from the formation of the county government in 1866 until Coalville became county seat in 1872.

The first two-story home built by Thomas Albert Smith, in Summit County was built in Wanship, and has since been relocated to Pioneer Village in Lagoon Amusement Park.

Wanship today
Today Wanship exists as a small, unincorporated community. There are a few businesses, including a filling station, and a museum in an old barn that contains a collection of antique carriages and other western memorabilia. The Wanship Dam, creating the Rockport Reservoir, was built south of the town in the mid-1950s.

Demographics
As of the census of 2010, there were 400 people living in the CDP. There were 164 housing units. The racial makeup of the town was 91.5% White, 0.3% American Indian and Alaska Native, 6.0% from some other race, and 2.3% from two or more races. Hispanic or Latino of any race were 8.8% of the population.

Education
It is in the North Summit School District.

See also

 List of census-designated places in Utah

References

External links

Census-designated places in Summit County, Utah
Census-designated places in Utah
Populated places established in 1859
1859 establishments in Utah Territory